Cephonodes rothschildi is a moth of the  family Sphingidae. It is known from the Star Mountains in Papua New Guinea.

References

Cephonodes
Moths described in 1907